Arne Starkey Duncan (born November 6, 1964) is an American educator who served as United States Secretary of Education from 2009 to 2015 and as Chief Executive Officer of Chicago Public Schools from 2001 to 2008. A lifelong resident of Chicago, Duncan is the founder of Create Real Economic Destiny (CRED), a non-profit aimed at reducing gun violence.

During Duncan's tenure as Secretary of Education, he was a key figure in the Obama administration's development of Common Core, a set of nationwide educational standards. This made him a controversial figure among those who opposed the federal government's taking on a stronger role in education policy.

Arne Duncan is currently a senior fellow at the University of Chicago Harris School of Public Policy and a board member for Communities In Schools and Community X.

Early life
Duncan was raised in Hyde Park, a Chicago neighborhood encompassing the University of Chicago. He is the son of Susan Goodrich (née Morton) and Starkey Davis Duncan Jr. His father was a psychology professor at the university and his mother runs the Sue Duncan Children's Center, an after-school program primarily serving African-American youth in the nearby Kenwood neighborhood.

Duncan attended the University of Chicago Laboratory Schools and later Harvard College, where he played on the basketball team and graduated magna cum laude in 1987 with a bachelor's degree in sociology. His senior thesis, for which he took a year's leave to do research in the Kenwood neighborhood, was entitled "The values, aspirations and opportunities of the urban underclass".

Education career
After graduating, Duncan played professional basketball for several years until 1991. In 1992, childhood friend and investment banker John W. Rogers, Jr., appointed Duncan director of the Ariel Education Initiative, a program mentoring children at one of the city's worst-performing elementary schools and then assisting them as they proceeded further in the education system. After the school closed in 1996, Duncan and Rogers were instrumental in re-opening it as a charter school, 
Ariel Community Academy. In 1999, Duncan was appointed deputy chief of staff to Chicago Public Schools CEO Paul Vallas.

CEO of Chicago Public Schools
Mayor Richard M. Daley appointed Duncan to serve as Chief Executive Officer of Chicago Public Schools on June 26, 2001. As CEO, Duncan was in charge of the implementation of the Renaissance 2010 initiative and served as the public spokesman for it.

Opinions vary on Duncan's success as CEO. In 2009, Kathleen Kingsbury of Time noted improved test scores and described Duncan as a consensus builder. Jitu Brown, Rico Gustein, and Pauline Lipman wrote a 2009 article published by Rethinking Education which argued that notion of improvements having been made to the school system were largely a myth, and which expressed concern over the closure of neighborhood schools and their replacement by charter schools, and what they described as schools' militarization.

U.S. Secretary of Education
Duncan was appointed U.S. Secretary of Education by President Barack Obama and confirmed by the Senate on January 20, 2009. One of Duncan's initiatives as secretary has been a $4 billion Race to the Top competition. It asks states to vie for federal education dollars by submitting proposals that include reforms such as expanding charter schools and judging teachers partly on how well their students do on standardized tests.

Illinois Senator Dick Durbin condemned the Bush-Kennedy charter schools for Washington, D.C., and Duncan and Obama got the vouchers eliminated. Speaker of the House John Boehner had them restored.

In March 2011, Duncan said 82 percent of the nation's public schools could be failing by the following year under the standards of the No Child Left Behind law. The projection amounted to a startling spike from previous data, which showed that 37 percent of schools were on track to miss targets set by the law. "Four out of five schools in America would not meet their goals under [No Child Left Behind] by next year", Duncan said in his statement.

Addressing a group of school superintendents in late 2013, Arne Duncan stated that he found it "fascinating" that some of the opposition to the Common Core State Standards Initiative came from "white suburban moms who—all of a sudden—their child isn't as brilliant as they thought they were, and their school isn't as good as they thought they were." He was widely criticized for framing the controversy in racial terms.

On July 4, 2014, the National Education Association, the largest teacher's union in the United States, passed a resolution of "no confidence" in Duncan's leadership of the Department of Education and asked for his resignation.

On July 13, 2014, the American Federation of Teachers approved a resolution calling for Education Secretary Arne Duncan to resign if he does not improve under a plan to be implemented by President Barack Obama. The "improvement plan" would require that Duncan enact the equity and funding recommendations of the Equity Commission's "Each and Every Child" report; revise the No Child Left Behind and Race To The Top "test-and-punish" system of accountability to a "support-and-improve" structure; and "promote rather than question" teachers and school staff.

On October 2, 2015, Duncan announced he would be stepping down at the close of 2015, to be succeeded by John King Jr. The media stated his tenure had been marked by a "willingness to plunge head-on into the heated debate about the government's role in education."

After the Department of Education 
In March 2016, Duncan announced he would join the Palo Alto-based education group Emerson Collective as a managing partner.

In 2017, he was appointed a distinguished senior fellow at the University of Chicago's Harris School of Public Policy.

His 2018 book, How Schools Work: An Inside Account of Failure and Success From One of the Nation’s Longest-Serving Secretaries of Education, details his work pushing forward the Common Core standard and discusses examples of students falling far below the education level needed to pursue college that instigated this policy push.

In 2021, Duncan endorsed Deborah Kerr, his former high school teacher, in the non-partisan race for Superintendent of Public Instruction of Wisconsin. Though Duncan has no direct ties to Wisconsin, he said "I was lucky to have Dr. Kerr as a high school teacher, her care for students is evident...Wisconsin needs a strong leader in this role and I am thrilled this state has the chance to have her as their next state superintendent." Alongside State Senator Lena Taylor of Milwaukee, Duncan was one of very few prominent Democrats to endorse Kerr in the race.

In January 2022, Duncan expressed interest in running for Mayor of Chicago in the 2023 Chicago mayoral election. In March 2022, he announced that he had decided not to run.

Personal life
While in Australia, Duncan met his future wife, Karen Leanne Duncan, a native of Tasmania. Their children are Claire and Ryan.

Basketball

While at Harvard, Duncan co-captained the varsity basketball team and was named a first team Academic All-American. From 1987 to 1991, Duncan played professional basketball, mostly in Australia, with teams including Melbourne's Eastside Spectres, of Australia's National Basketball League.
Duncan also participated in the 2012, 2013, 2014, and 2020 NBA All-Star Weekend Celebrity Games. Comedian Kevin Hart conceded the 2014 MVP of the celebrity game to Duncan (20 points, 11 rebounds, 6 assists). The 20 points are a Celebrity Game high.

On May 11, 2014, Duncan was a member of the 2014 USA Basketball 3x3 Men's Championship Team. The team of Duncan, Jitim Young, Thomas Darrow and Craig Moore qualified to represent the United States in Moscow, Russia in the 24-country 2014 FIBA 3x3 World Championship from June 5–8. Duncan's schedule did not permit him to attend, but the team finished in 9th place in the 24-team tournament.

Publications

References

External links

 
 United States Department of Education bio
 The Sue Duncan Children's Center
 
 
 
 

|-

|-

1964 births
Living people
American athlete-politicians
American expatriate basketball people in Australia
Basketball players from Illinois
CEOs of Chicago Public Schools
Eastside Spectres players
Harvard Crimson men's basketball players
Illinois Democrats

Obama administration cabinet members
21st-century American politicians
Politicians from Chicago
People from Arlington County, Virginia
United States Secretaries of Education
University of Chicago Laboratory Schools alumni
Henry Crown Fellows
American men's basketball players
Educators from Illinois
Harvard College alumni
Brookings Institution people